Leonard George Casley (28 August 1925 – 13 February 2019), better known as Prince Leonard, was the founder of the self-proclaimed micronation, the Principality of Hutt River, within the Australian state of Western Australia. He governed Hutt River from 21 April 1970 until his abdication in February 2017, at a coronation ceremony that placed his son Prince Graeme on the throne.

Having pursued a number of occupations, Casley eventually settled on farming, purchasing a large wheat farm near the towns of Northampton and Geraldton in the 1960s where he came to own . In 1970, he declared independence and founded Hutt River Province in response to a dispute with the Government of Western Australia over what the Casley family considered draconian wheat production quotas. "His Royal Highness Prince Leonard I of Hutt" was the style used by Casley from the creation of the Principality until his death.

Early life
Prince Leonard was born in Kalgoorlie, Western Australia to George William Casley, who worked on the railways, and Enes (née Hunter). Growing up alongside younger brother Mervyn, Casley was a high school dropout who left his education during his childhood when he was studying in sixth standard.

Career
Casley worked for a shipping company based in Perth. Although he left school at fourteen he described himself as a mathematician and physicist; he also claimed to have written articles for NASA.

Military service
Casley served in the Royal Australian Air Force (RAAF) between 1943 and 1946, including in Borneo.

Hutt River Province

In 1969, established what he called the Hutt River Province in protest at quotas being placed on wheat. He declared independence on 21 April 1970.

He created its own flag and tax system governed by laws which were enacted by his self-declared government consisting five ministers. Leonard sought to evade paying Australian taxes, and was found to owe $3 million in income tax in 2017. As part of this tax case, he sought to justify his position on the basis of the pseudolegal Strawman theory. Although Casley created stamps, micronation currency (Hutt River Dollar), visas, and passports for his sovereign state, the federal Government of Australia never officially recognised Hutt River as an official and independent nation, and later, it became a well-known tourist attraction in Australia.

Abdication
In January 2017, Prince Leonard announced that, after ruling for 45 years, he would be stepping down as prince, to be succeeded by his youngest son, Graeme. With a number of potential sons and daughters, the successor was nominated by Casley and approved by a crown committee. Some commentary at the time had expected his older son, Ian, to be the successor.

In June 2017, Casley was ordered by the Supreme Court of Western Australia to pay $2.7 million unpaid tax.

Personal life
Casley was married to Shirley (née Butler) until her death on 7 July 2013, when the Principality went into a period of mourning, closing some of its services. She was styled as "Her Royal Highness Princess Shirley of Hutt, Dame of the Rose of Sharon", and she played host to dignitaries and diplomatic representatives visiting the Principality each year, as well as receiving television crews and magazine journalists. She was the patroness and chair of the board of directors of the Red Cross of Hutt, a parallel organisation to the International Red Cross.

As an adherent of hermeticism, Casley privately published a number of research papers and books on the subject. He is the subject of a permanent exhibit at the National Museum of Australia in Canberra.

Death
Casley died two years after abdicating the throne of Hutt River, on 13 February 2019, at the age of ninety-three. His principality outlived him by 18 months and was dissolved on 3 August 2020.

References

External links 

 Leonard Casley at Principality of Hutt River

1925 births
2019 deaths
Royal Australian Air Force personnel of World War II
Hermeticists
Monarchs who abdicated
Monarchy in Australia
Micronational leaders
People from Kalgoorlie
Princes
Royal Australian Air Force airmen
Self-proclaimed monarchy